Angelika Machinek (17 November 1956 – 12 October 2006) was a German glider pilot. She was five times German gliding champion and broke nine FIA gliding world records, four in the D1M class, four in D15 and one in DO. She was also a dramaturge and published writer.

Life
Angelika Machinek was born on 17 November 1956 in the village of Eschershausen in the district of Holzminden. She studied sociology and German at University of Göttingen and received her doctorate in modern German literature from Goethe University Frankfurt in 1985. She subsequently worked as a dramaturge and author on topics including the Göttingen Seven.

At the age of 14, she started gliding, gaining her pilot’s license in 1973, aerobatic license in 1979 and instructor’s license in 1980. She competed at national and international level, being named German Champion five times, in 1994 at Marpingen, 1998 at Jena, 2000 at Neresheim, 2004 at Klix and 2006 at Coburg. She won the Elly-Beinhorn Rally in 1998, the first International Hexencup in 2003 and the first International Flatland Cup in Szeged, Hungary, in 2006. The FAI Gliding Commission presented her with the Pelagia Majewska Gliding Medal in 2000 for her achievements.

Dr Machinek was killed, aged 49, near Echzell in Hesse. She crashed while flying a microlight.

World Records 
Dr Machinek has held a total of nine gliding records in three different classes as recognised by the FAI Gliding Commission.

Publications 
 Machinek, Angelika. B. Traven und Max Stirner: der Einfluss Stirners auf Ret Marut-B. Traven : eine literatursoziologische Untersuchung zur Affinitat ihrer Weltanschauungen. Göttingen: Davids Drucke, 1986.
 Machinek, Angelika. Dann wird Gehorsam zum Verbrechen: die Göttinger Sieben, ein Konflikt um Obrigkeitswillkür und Zivilcourage. Göttingen : Steidl (in collaboration with Göttingen Theatre), 1989.
 Wallraff, Günter; Angelika Machinek. Wallraff war da: ein Lesebuch. Göttingen : Steidl, 1989.

Legacy 
Dr Machinek was a strong advocate of women’s gliding and a fund to promote women glider pilots was set up as a legacy for her on 6 January 2007. In 2016, a road in Bockenheim was also named after her. In 2017, a path on the Ith was named Angelika Machinek Weg in her honour.

References

1956 births
2006 deaths
Dramaturges
German women aviators
Glider flight record holders
Goethe University Frankfurt alumni
People from Holzminden (district)
University of Göttingen alumni